The Church of El Salvador (Spanish: Iglesia del Salvador) is a Roman Catholic church located in Carabias, a settlement in the municipality of Sigüenza, Spain. It was declared Bien de Interés Cultural in 1965.

The stone church was built in a rustic Romanesque style.

References 

Bien de Interés Cultural landmarks in the Province of Guadalajara
Romanesque architecture in Castilla–La Mancha
Roman Catholic churches in Sigüenza